The Protestant church of Damwâld-Dantumawâld or Saint Benedict’s church is a religious building in Damwâld-Dantumawâld, one of the  medieval churches in Friesland.
The church was built in the 12th century out of Tuffstone. In 1775 the current triple closed choir was built, in it are two large Romanesque windows. The tower dates from the 13th century and is built out of brick.  The Pipe organ was built in 1777 by Albertus Antoni Hinsz.

The church is located on the Doniawei 76 and was once a Roman Catholic church dedicated to Saint Boniface but became a Protestant church after the protestant reformation. It is listed as a Rijksmonument, number 11681.

See also
The Protestant church of Damwâld-Moarrewâld

References

Damwald-Dantumawald
Rijksmonuments in Friesland
Romanesque architecture in the Netherlands
Dantumadiel
Protestant churches in the Netherlands